Daniel Santos Martins (born 23 June 1993) is a Portuguese professional footballer who most recently played for French Championnat National club Créteil as a left defender.

Club career
Martins was born in Torres Vedras, Portugal. On 30 January 2013, Martins signed with Belenenses.

Martins signed with Créteil in the French Championnat National in the summer of 2020. After a half-time incident in the Coupe de France match against JS Suresnes on 18 October 2020, in which it is reported that Martins physically attacked a staff member, he was suspended by the club on grounds of serious misconduct. On 12 November 2020 his contract was terminated.

International career
He represented Portugal U19 in the 2012 UEFA European Under-19 Football Championship, where he played in all three of Portugal's group fixtures, scoring against Estonia in the opening game.

References

External links

1993 births
Living people
People from Torres Vedras
Portuguese footballers
Association football defenders
S.L. Benfica B players
C.F. Os Belenenses players
S.C. Beira-Mar players
FC Universitatea Cluj players
F.C. Penafiel players
S.C. Covilhã players
US Créteil-Lusitanos players
Liga Portugal 2 players
Primeira Liga players
Liga I players
Championnat National players
Portuguese expatriate footballers
Expatriate footballers in Romania
Expatriate footballers in France
Portuguese expatriate sportspeople in Romania
Portugal youth international footballers
Portuguese expatriate sportspeople in France
Sportspeople from Lisbon District